Arnold Östman (born December 24, 1939) is a Swedish conductor and music director.

Early life
Born in Malmö, Sweden, Östman studied art history and musicology at Lund, Paris and Stockholm. As a musician, he concentrated on the piano and the harpsichord, being largely self-taught. During his years as a researcher, he focused on the subject of early opera, bringing to light a number of theretofore unknown or little-known baroque operas.

Östman was a teacher at the Operahögskolan i Stockholm (then called the ) in 1969. He was theatre and museum director at the Drottningholms Teatermuseum (later known as Sveriges Teatermuseum) in Stockholm starting in 1979.

Conducting career

Östman was artistic director and conductor of the Vadstena Academy from 1971 until 1981, while also serving as conductor and artistic director of the NorrlandsOperan in Umeå from 1974 until 1978.

He was made artistic director of the Drottningholm Palace Theatre in 1980 and remained in that role until 1992. He gained an international reputation as a champion of the period performance movement in classical music, a movement that insists on the performance of repertoire from c. 1600 to 1820 (i.e., baroque, classical, and early romantic) using instruments (or modern replicas), techniques, and stylistic sensibilities from the appropriate period. In particular, Drottningholm's productions of Mozart operas with period instruments caused a considerable stir in the early days of the historical-performance movement. To Östman, use of historically appropriate instruments is vital to developing an understanding of the Mozartian style:
It's so important to use classical instruments. We make mistakes with them, but we keep trying because it is really important complementary information, which has a scientific value. Yet we don't use it as Scientists, we use it for artistic freedom. The more information you have, the more freedom you have.

Outside Sweden, Östman has conducted a wide range of repertoire at the opera houses of Covent Garden, Vienna, Parma, Trieste, Cologne, Bonn, Toulouse, Nice, Wexford, Madrid, Washington, Lausanne, Paris (Garnier and Bastille) and at the Schwetzingen and Vienna Festivals, among others.

As a symphonic conductor, Östman has worked with many major European orchestras, including the German radio orchestras in Hamburg, Frankfurt, Cologne, Stuttgart and Baden-Baden; the Gürzenich Orchestra Cologne; the Freiburg Baroque Orchestra; the Orchestre Philharmonique de Radio France; the Orchestre National de France; the Academy of Ancient Music; the Geneva Chamber Orchestra; the Royal Concertgebouw Orchestra of Amsterdam, the Netherlands’ Radio Chamber Orchestra, the Scottish Chamber Orchestra, the Gothenburg Symphony, the Oslo Philharmonic, the Mahler Chamber Orchestra, the Rotterdam Philharmonic Orchestra and the Philharmoniker Hamburg.

Operatic recordings (audio)

Operatic recordings (video)

Awards and recognition
Arnold Östman was awarded the newspaper Expressen's Spelmannen in 1974. He was awarded an honorary doctorate at Umeå University in 1979 and he is a Chevalier of the Legion of Honour. He was awarded the Litteris et Artibus 1990 and was elected to the Royal Swedish Academy of Music May 14, 1992. In 2010 he was awarded the H. M. The King's Medal, "for significant contributions to Swedish music".

References

1939 births
Swedish conductors (music)
Male conductors (music)
Musicians from Malmö
Living people
Music directors (opera)
Swedish harpsichordists
21st-century conductors (music)
21st-century Swedish male musicians
Members of the Royal Swedish Academy of Music
Litteris et Artibus recipients